The 2nd Secretariat of the Lao People's Revolutionary Party (LPRP), officially the Secretariat of the 2nd National Congress of the Lao People's Revolutionary Party, was elected at the 1st Plenary Session of the 2nd Central Committee in 1972.

Members

Add-ons

References

Specific

Bibliography
Articles:
 

2nd Secretariat of the Lao People's Revolutionary Party
1972 establishments in Laos
1982 disestablishments in Laos